The UCL Institute of Jewish Studies is an institute located in London, United Kingdom dedicated to the academic study of all branches of Jewish history and civilization. It is a privately funded institute within the Department of Hebrew and Jewish Studies at University College London (UCL), the largest department of Hebrew and Jewish studies in Europe.

The institute is located at the main UCL campus in Bloomsbury, close to the British Library, the Wiener Library, the Warburg Institute, Dr Williams's Library, the library of the School of Oriental and African Studies and the UCL Jewish Studies Collection, which houses the Moccatta Library, the Altman Collection and a substantial collection of unique Yiddish material.  The staff and students are mostly Jewish, unlike other UK faculties for Jewish studies in the UK.

History

The institute was founded by Alexander Altmann in Manchester in 1954 as the Institute of Jewish Studies. In 1959, following the departure of Altmann as director, the institute moved to UCL.

Altmann's justification for the activities of the institute was given in a 1957 lecture to the Hillel Foundation of London :

Victor Mishcon became chairman of the institute in 1959.

Activities

Events

The institute organises public lectures, symposia and seminars throughout the academic year, where leading scholars from Europe, Israel and the United States communicate the results of their research to scholars, students and the public, thereby creating the opportunity for regular exchange of ideas and interests.

The institute also hosts one or more major international conferences annually, which focus on significant themes relating to Jewish civilisation, and bring together eminent scholars from different countries working in the same or allied fields of research.

Research

The institute regularly sponsors research projects by postgraduates and scholars in important academic fields.

Publications

The institute sponsors the publication of its conference proceedings and other academic works in co-operation with publishers, including Cambridge University Press, Oxford University Press, and the Littman Library of Jewish Civilisation.

See also
Institute of Jewish Studies (Nanjing)

References

Further reading

.
.
.

External links
Institute of Jewish Studies, University College London
UCL Department of Hebrew and Jewish Studies
The Wiener Library Institute of Contemporary History
The Warburg Institute
Dr Williams's Trust and Library
The Littman Library of Jewish Civilization

University College London
Jewish organisations based in the United Kingdom
Jewish studies research institutes
Judaic studies